Sodium telluride is the chemical compound with the formula Na2Te.  This salt is the conjugate base of the thermally unstable acid hydrogen telluride, but it is usually prepared by reduction of tellurium with sodium.  Na2Te is a challenging material to handle because it is very sensitive to air.  Air oxidizes it initially to polytellurides, which have the formula Na2Tex (x > 1), and ultimately Te metal.  Samples of Na2Te, which are colourless when absolutely pure, generally appear purple or dark gray due to the effects of air oxidation.

Synthesis, structure, and solution properties
The synthesis is typically conducted using ammonia as the solvent.

Na2Te, like many related compounds with the formula M2X, adopts the antifluorite structure.  Thus, in solid Na2Te each Te2− ion is surrounded by eight Na+ ions and each Na+ ion is surrounded by four Te2− ions.

Simple salts of the type M2X, where X is a monatomic anion, are not typically soluble in any solvent because they have a high lattice energy.  Upon addition of water - even moist air - or treatment with alcohols, Te2− protonates:
Na2Te  +  H2O  →  NaHTe  +  NaOH
Because of this reaction, many processes attributed to Na2Te may involve NaHTe (CAS # 65312-92-7), which is more soluble and formed readily.

Applications in organic chemistry
Na2Te finds use in organic synthesis, both as a reagent for reductions and as a source of Te in the synthesis of organotellurium compounds.  Aryl halides are substituted to diaryl tellurides, as illustrated by the synthesis of dinaphthyltelluride:
Na2Te  +  2 C10H7I  →  (C10H7)2Te  +  2  NaI

Na2Te reacts with 1,3-diynes to give the corresponding tellurophene, which are structurally analogous to thiophenes:
Na2Te  +  RC≡C-C≡CR  +  2 H2O  →  TeC4R2H2  +  2  NaOH

As a reducing agent, Na2Te converts nitro groups to amines and will cleave certain C-X bonds.

References

Tellurides
Sodium compounds
Fluorite crystal structure